Juan Tellez-Girón y Enriquez de Ribera, 4th Duke of  Osuna (15 November 1597 – 12 October 1656) was Viceroy of Sicily from 1655 to 1656. He was the only male descendant of  Pedro Téllez-Girón, 3rd Duke of Osuna who was born in December 1579, and was Viceroy of Sicily from 1610 to 1615 and Viceroy of Naples from 1615 to 1620. His mother was Catalina Enriquez de Ribera y Cortés who died in November 1635 and was one of 3 daughters of Fernando Enriquez, 2nd Duke of Alcalá de los Gazules.

He married Isabel Raimunda de Sandoval y Padilla, who died in 1658 and was the daughter of Cristóbal de Sandoval, Duke of Uceda. They had two children:
Pedro Baltasar Téllez Girón,  Marquis of  Peñafiel, born April 1624 and died as a young child
Gaspar Téllez-Girón, 5th Duke de Osuna, born May 1625 and died in June 1694. He was Duke of Osuna (1656–1694) and Viceroy of Catalonia (1667–1669), and married twice, first with  Felisa de Sandoval, 3rd Duchess of Uceda and then with Ana Antonia de Benavides y Ponce de Leon, 6th Marchioness of  Frómista.

Bibliography
 Jorge Valverde Fraikin.  Titulos Nobiliarios Andaluces,  Editorial Andalucia, Granada,(1991).
 D. António Caetano de Sousa História Genealógica da Casa Real Portuguesa, Atlântida-Livraria Editora, Lda, 2ª Edição, Coimbra, (1946).
Felgueiras Gayo Carvalhos de Basto, 2ª Edição.Nobiliário das Famílias de Portugal, Braga, (1989)

1597 births
1656 deaths
Viceroys of Sicily
Dukes of Osuna
Juan
Juan
Grandees of Spain